Glenn Alexander Norberg-Hysén (born 12 May 1987) is a Swedish former footballer who played as a goalkeeper.

Early years 
He was born to parents Glenn Hysén of Liverpool F.C. fame and his second wife Helena. Alexander has two younger siblings named Anton and Annie as well as two older siblings from his fathers first marriage named Tobias and Charlotte. He is the great-grandson of Erik Hysén.

Club career 
Like his brothers, Alexander started his youth career at Torslanda IK. He made his debut for Häcken in 2006 where he continued to play for the next three years. In 2008, Alexander was the second goalie and got very little playing time. In 2009, he moved to Superettan side GIF Sundsvall. In April 2010 he was sent on loan to Östersunds FK in the third tier of the Swedish League system.

International career 
In 2007, he was capped twice for the Sweden national under-21 team.

References

External links 

 

1987 births
Living people
Swedish footballers
Sweden under-21 international footballers
Association football goalkeepers
Allsvenskan players
BK Häcken players
Torslanda IK players
Östersunds FK players